The 1993 Brazilian Grand Prix was a Formula One motor race held at Interlagos on 28 March 1993. It was the second race of the 1993 Formula One World Championship.

The 71-lap race was won by local hero Ayrton Senna, driving a McLaren-Ford, with English driver Damon Hill second in a Williams-Renault and German Michael Schumacher third in a Benetton-Ford. Senna was the last Brazilian driver to win his home race until Felipe Massa in 2006.

Report

Qualifying
Brazil was Senna's home race but he was able to do nothing to prevent the Williamses being 1–2 in qualifying with Prost on pole ahead of Hill. Senna was third ahead of Schumacher, Andretti and Patrese.

Race
At the start, Senna got ahead of Hill but Andretti hit Berger with both crashing hard in the tyre barrier in turn 1. Both of them along with Brundle and Fabrizio Barbazza's Minardi were out. The order was: Prost, Senna, Hill, a fast starting Jean Alesi, Schumacher, and Lehto.

Schumacher passed Alesi on lap 2, but his teammate Patrese only lasted until the fourth lap when his suspension failed. While Prost built up a substantial lead, Senna was under pressure from Hill who took second on lap 11. On lap 25, Senna was issued a stop-go penalty for lapping a backmarker under yellow flags and dropped behind Schumacher. There was a heavy rain shower, and many drivers pitted for wet tyres, including Senna, Schumacher and Hill, while Prost stayed out on slick tyres. Several drivers spun, with both Ukyo Katayama and Aguri Suzuki crashing on the start–finish straight on lap 27, the Footwork partially blocking the circuit and bringing out the safety car – the second time this had been seen in Formula 1 following its trial at the 1973 Canadian Grand Prix. Fittipaldi spun at the first corner on lap 30 with his car stopped in the middle of the track. With the rain coming down harder, Prost lost control and, unable to avoid Fittipaldi's car, crashed into him, taking them both out of the race. As the wreckage was cleared, the new safety car controlled the field, Hill led Senna, Schumacher (who had lost time during his pit stop because his car fell off the jack), Alesi, Johnny Herbert, and Lehto. They were followed by Alessandro Zanardi, Philippe Alliot, Mark Blundell, Derek Warwick, rookie Luca Badoer, Karl Wendlinger, Andrea de Cesaris, Érik Comas, and Michele Alboreto.

The rain stopped and the safety car went in, and the order stayed as listed. The sun then came out, it began to dry rapidly and everyone stopped for dry tyres. Johnny Herbert had pitted for slicks right when the safety car pulled back into the pits, and he was to move up to third place due to this early change back to slicks.

Just after the tire stops Senna passed Hill for the lead and pulled away. Behind, Schumacher and Alesi had stop-go penalties for passing under yellow flags, Schumacher dropping to fifth and Alesi going down to ninth. Schumacher passed Blundell and then Herbert to take third. Senna won from Hill, Schumacher, Herbert, Blundell and Alessandro Zanardi.

Classification

Qualifying

Race

Championship standings after the race

Drivers' Championship standings

Constructors' Championship standings

 Note: Only the top five positions are included for both sets of standings.

References

Brazilian Grand Prix
Brazilian Grand Prix
Grand Prix
Brazilian Grand Prix